Kiva Simova is a Canadian harmonic overtone singer, keyboard player, and songwriter, based in Winnipeg, MB, Canada. She is internationally recognized as a western pioneer in world beat/jazz music, particularly the art of harmonic overtone singing (singing two pitches simultaneously) which she both performs, records and teaches. She has composed for overtone choir and directed her own such choir, AURALIA in Prague.

Discography 

Kiva has released three solo CDs featuring original compositions and her own style of overtone singing and recorded albums with a diverse range of artists.

Kiva's solo recordings include 1998's 'The Ladder', featuring thirteen originals by Kiva, one song co-written with Gary Taylor and one cover of a Bob Fuhr/ Larry Hicock song.
Her 2004 album 'Pulse' features ten originals, including co-writes with Rhys Fulber, Nii Tettey Tetteh, John Hudson, Jay Stoller and Jordan Hanson.
The third album, 'The Quality of Light', released December 2013 (with artist name adjusted to 'Kiva Simova') contains ten originals. It features an improvised piece co-written with didgeridoo player Ondrej Smeykal.

The Ladder (1998) – Yemyss Music (indie)

Tracks

 Tuva on Rye
 Untouchable
 Gone Forever
 Seven Years
 The Big Picture
 Egyptian Eyes
 Venus and the Fly
 Dare to Lose
 The Flip Side
 The Science Project
 Heart Overboard
 Interlude in Monkey Forest
 On the Ganges
 Freedom to Go
 Regret

Musicians

 Kiva: vocals, piano, keyboards, percussion, jaw harp
 Gary Taylor: drums, percussion, keyboards, sampling
 Mike Bossy: bass
 John Gzowski: guitar
 Kevin Breit: guitar
 Rob Piltch: guitar
 Chris Bennett: guitar
 Oliver Schroer: violin (deceased 2008)
 Rob Gusevs: organ
 Bob Taillefer: pedal steel
 Anne Bourne: cello
 Dave Maurakis: cello
 Jim Casson: percussion

Pulse (2004) – Yemyss Music (indie)

Tracks

 Sanctuary
 Donde Soweika
 Serendipity Doodah
 Everything Goes
 Morning Dew Ragu
 The Incident
 Firecracker Suite
 That Zing
 Kaida Kei
 In the Flesh

Musicians

 Kiva: vocals, piano, keyboards
 John Hudson: percussion
 Heidi Hunter: acoustic harp
 Rodrigo Munoz: percussion
 Don Benedictson: bass
 Jay Stoller: percussion
 Richard Moody: viola
 Mahabub Khan: tabla, additional vocals
 Jane Miller: additional vocals
 Nii Tettey Tetteh: percussion, African flute
 Bill Spornitz: soprano saxophone
 Eli Herscovitch: clarinet
 Jordan Hanson & Batuque Ensemble: percussion

The Quality of Light (2014) – Yemyss Music (indie)

Tracks

 Going Down
 Sea Legs
 The Endeared Ones
 Bitter my Sweet
 Just in Case
 In Her Nature
 Resurrected
 Common Thread
 The Opposite of Torture
 Meeting in Dreamtime

Musicians

Kiva Simova: vocals, grand piano, Wurlitzer keyboard
Jim Casson: percussion
Ian de Souza: electric bass
George Koller: upright acoustic bass
Lucy Fillery-Murphy: cello
Ondrej Smeykal: didgeridoo

Professional reviews

 Steve Baylin, Ottawa Xpress

Recordings with other artists

 Live in Poughkeepsie, Crash Test Dummies, 1994 (keyboards, backup vocals)
 It's All Right, Xiao Ping Lee, 1996 (producer, arranger, backup vocals)
 Moksha, The New Millennium Orchestra, 1996 (harmonic overtoning)
 Dancing with the Living, Strange Angels, 1997 (keyboards, backup vocals)
 Circle of Days, The Ring Cycle, 1998 (harmonic overtoning, improvised vocals)
 Sin & other Salvations, The Wyrd Sisters, 2001 (keyboards, backup vocals)
 Waiting for Catherine, The Ormidales, 2008 (backup vocals)
 The Quality of Light, Live Ullmann, 2008 (lyrics & melody by Kiva, backup vocals)
 In These Arms- A Song for All Beings, Jennifer Berezan and Friends, 2011 (guest lead vocals)
  Jenny Robinson- http://www.jennyrobinson.ca Jenny Robinson 2016 (keyboards, backup vocals)

Film Soundtracks

  Beit Sha'ar (Nomad's Home), 2010, by Iman Kamel
  Blood Pressure, 2012, by Sean Garrity
  Unless, 2016
  Sharkwater Extinction, 2018

References 

Canadian songwriters
Canadian world music musicians
Canadian women jazz singers
Living people
Year of birth missing (living people)